Hesperochroa is a genus of moths of the family Erebidae. The genus was erected by George Hampson in 1926.

Species
Hesperochroa multiscripta (Holland, 1894) Gabon, Cameroon, Zaire
Hesperochroa polygrapha Berio, 1964 Zaire

References

Calpinae